{{safesubst:#invoke:RfD||2=F-zerogplegend.com|month = February
|day = 21
|year = 2023
|time = 10:26
|timestamp = 20230221102621

|content=
REDIRECT F-Zero: GP Legend

}}